Aharon Mor (born 22 August 1947) is a Polish-born Israeli civil servant who, as senior director, heads the Restitution of Rights and Jewish Property Department at the Israeli Ministry of Pensioner Affairs, which is affiliated with the Prime Minister's Office. He has worked at the Ministry of Finance and at the Prime Minister's Office, and has represented the Jewish state abroad as an emissary in a number of international organizations.

Mor is the writer and editor of the First Global Report for Restitution of Rights and Jewish Property (1952–2004), and in 2010 was nominated by Prime Minister Benjamin Netanyahu to be a member of the National Advisory Board for Restitution Rights and Jewish Property. He is also a member of the Advisory Board of the European Shoah Legacy Institute.

Background
Mor (previously Malowany) was born in 1947 in Wrocław, Poland, to parents who were both survivors of the Holocaust (Shoah). He spent his childhood in Poland and made Aliyah to Israel in 1957. He lived with his parents on a moshav, studying and working on the family farm. In 1966 he was drafted to the Israel Defense Forces and served as a soldier in the Six-Day War in 1967, as an officer in the War of Attrition in 1969, and as an officer (res.) in the Yom Kippur War in 1973. He currently serves as a major (res.) in the IDF Spokesperson's Unit.

Mor studied at the Hebrew University of Jerusalem, earning a B.A. in economics in 1974. He earned an M.A. in public administration and public policy in 2001 while writing two M.A. theses. The first thesis was titled "Tax Reduction for Donors of Non-Profit Organizations in Israel in Reference to Fundraising of Israeli Non-Profit Organizations". His second was titled "A Comparative Analysis of Shoah Restitution in Three European Countries since the 1990s". Mor is currently working on a Ph.D. on the topic of Restitution of Jewish Property from the Holocaust Era, for which he was awarded a Fulbright fellowship.

Government work
Mor began his work at the Ministry of Finance in 1973 as an economist dealing with collective bargaining. After serving as an economist in 1977-78 at the budget department, in 1978 he became supervisor of Income Tax dealing with Investments and Foreign Investors at the Head Office of Revenue, while also serving as a board member of the Investment Promotion Center. In 1988 became associate director of the Investment Authority. Mor served as a director at the International Affairs Department from 2001 to 2008, when he left the Ministry of Finance for his current position. In 2004-05 he served as senior advisor for the restitution of rights and Jewish property at the Prime Minister's Office and was nominated by the Israeli cabinet as co-chairman of the steering committee for restitution of Jewish rights and property.

Representing Israel
Mor represented Israel as an emissary with three different organizations during three stints overseas: as Regional Director for the United Israel Appeal in the United Kingdom with the Joint Israel Appeal (1983–86, now the UJIA); in Canada with the Jewish Federation (1991–95); and in Australia with the Jewish National Fund (2001–02). He has also worked with organizations such as the World Jewish Restitution Organization (a branch of the World Jewish Congress), the Swiss Humanitarian Fund and the ICHEIC.

Mor participated in international conferences on restitution of Jewish property from the Holocaust era in Washington (1998), Vilnius (2000), and Prague (2009). He also participated in the process of accession of Israel to the OECD in 2008 and in the Prague conference process of 2010.

Other
Mor served as a youth counselor in his moshav during 1961-66, and as counselor and team leader for overseas students at Hebrew University during 1970-73. He also served on the boards of two community centers, one in Jerusalem and one in Mevaseret Zion.

Mor has established a number of NGOs. The first, established in 1974, helped families of the soldiers in his reserve tank brigade during wartime. The second, established in 1982, dealt with municipal issues. The third, established in 1997, dealt with programs for preventing violence at elementary schools.

In addition to his own studies, Mor is involved in the academic sector. He has lectured on a number of topics at the University of Haifa, the Israel Center for Management and the JDC Center for Lay Leadership. Mor has published over 40 papers on topics such as Israel's accession to the OECD, the Diaspora, non-profit institutions and restitution of Jewish property.

Mor volunteers as Chairperson of Kvutzat Reut, an educational NGO in Jerusalem. He is fluent in Hebrew, English and Polish and knows some French, Yiddish and Russian. He has three adult sons and lives near Jerusalem.

References

1947 births
Living people
Hebrew University of Jerusalem Faculty of Social Sciences alumni
Israeli Ashkenazi Jews
Israeli civil servants
Israeli economists
Israeli people of Polish-Jewish descent
Polish emigrants to Israel
Yiddish-speaking people